Neurocrine can refer to:
 A type of cell signaling similar to paracrine, but involving neurons. See chemical synapse for more details.
 Neurocrine Biosciences

 Any molecule secreted by a nerve cell: Lipids, Gases, Peptides, Purines, Amine, Amino acids, Acetylcholine